Caithréim Chellacháin Chaisil ("The Victorious Career of Cellachán of Cashel") is an Irish  tract from the first part of the 12th century. It is most likely written some time between 1127 and 1134, commissioned by Cormac Mac Carthaigh, king of Munster and claimant to the title High King of Ireland. The tale is ostensibly a biography of Cormac's 10th century ancestor Cellachán Caisil, but in reality a propaganda tract.

It is written as an Eóganacht riposte to the Dál Cais/Uí Briain chronicle, Cogad Gáedel re Gallaib, but reflects the current political situation where former rivals Dál Cais and Eóganachta are allied against Tairrdelbach Ua Conchobair, with an emphasis on collaboration between Cellachán Caisil and Cennétig mac Lorcáin against their common foe, the Vikings.

A copy of Caithréim Chellacháin Chaisil is contained in the Book of Lismore, as well as in several other manuscripts. The most recent edition of Caithréim was made by the Norwegian scholar Alexander Bugge in 1905. This edition is based on the text contained in Book of Lismore and R.I.A. 23 H 18 (707), with critical variants from British Library Egerton 106 occasionally cited.

Notes and references

Notes

References
Footnotes

Bibliography

External links
 Bugge's edition at Openlibrary.org
 Cellachan.
 Callahan Genealogy and History website, including a copy and lengthy discussion of this book..

Historiography of Ireland
Texts of medieval Ireland
Irish manuscripts
MacCarthy dynasty
Irish books